Vladimirka  is the colloquial name for the Vladimir Highway, Russia.

Vladimirka may also refer to:

Vladimirka (painting), a painting by Isaac Levitan

See also
Vladimirko